Abidemi Sanusi is a Nigerian author.

Biography
Abidemi Sanusi was born in Lagos, Nigeria. She had her Education in England, and attended Leeds University.

Sanusi worked as a human rights worker, and now manages a website for writers.

Kemi's Journal (2005) was her first work of fiction, followed by Zack's Story of Life, Love and Everything. God Has Daughters Too is a devotional book written about 10 women of the Old Testament.
Her most recent novel, Eyo, published by WordAlive Publishers was shortlisted for the 2010 Commonwealth Writers' Prize.

Works published
Eyo (2009)
Kemi's Journal  (2005)
God Has Daughters Too (2006)
Zack's Story of Life, Love and Everything  (2006)
Looking for Bono (2020)

References

External links
 Abidemi Sanusi website
 WordAlive Publishers website
 Cassava Republic

21st-century British novelists
Living people
Nigerian women novelists
Yoruba women writers
Writers from Lagos
21st-century Nigerian novelists
Alumni of the University of Leeds
Nigerian Christians
Nigerian emigrants to the United Kingdom
British women novelists
21st-century British women writers
Year of birth missing (living people)
Yoruba people
21st-century Nigerian women writers